Kirs is a town and the administrative center of Verkhnekamsky District in Kirov Oblast, Russia, located on the Kirs River near its confluence with the Vyatka,  northeast of Kirov, the administrative center of the oblast. Population:

History
It was established as a settlement around a cast iron foundry built in 1729. In 1862, the foundry was retrofitted to produce merchant bars. Town status was granted to Kirs in 1965.

Administrative and municipal status
Within the framework of administrative divisions, Kirs serves as the administrative center of Verkhnekamsky District. As an administrative division, it is, together with six rural localities, incorporated within Verkhnekamsky District as the Town of Kirs. As a municipal division, the Town of Kirs is incorporated within Verkhnekamsky Municipal District as Kirsinskoye Urban Settlement.

References

Notes

Sources

Cities and towns in Kirov Oblast
1729 establishments in the Russian Empire
Monotowns in Russia
Slobodskoy Uyezd
Verkhnekamsky District